The Nonsuch 324 is a Canadian sailboat, that was designed by Mark Ellis Design and first built in 1994. It was the last of the series of Nonsuch sailboats built.

The Nonsuch 324 is a development of the Nonsuch 30, with the same hull design, but a taller rig, more sail area, a carbon fibre wishbone boom and a shallow-draft wing keel.

Production
The design was built by Hinterhoeller Yachts in St. Catharines, Ontario, Canada, but only a small number were completed before production ended.

Design
The Nonsuch 324 is a small recreational keelboat, built predominantly of fiberglass. It has a cat rig, an unstayed mast with a carbon fibre wishbone boom, a plumb stem, a vertical transom, an internally-mounted spade-type rudder controlled by a wheel and a fixed wing keel. It displaces  and carries  of ballast.

See also
List of sailing boat types

Related development
Nonsuch 30

Similar sailboats
Aloha 32
Bayfield 30/32
Beneteau 31
Beneteau 323
C&C 32
Columbia 32
Contest 32 CS
Douglas 32
Hunter 32 Vision
Hunter 326
Mirage 32
Morgan 32
Ontario 32
Ranger 32
Watkins 32

References

Keelboats
1990s sailboat type designs
Sailing yachts
Sailboat type designs by Mark Ellis
Sailboat types built by Hinterhoeller Yachts